The 2017–18 Bangladesh Cricket League was the sixth edition of the Bangladesh Cricket League, a first-class cricket competition. It was held in Bangladesh, starting on 6 January 2018 and concluding on 27 April 2018. North Zone were the defending champions.

In round two of the tournament, Tushar Imran scored his 10,000th run in first-class cricket and Abdur Razzak took his 500th first-class wicket. This was the first time either of these landmarks had been reached in Bangladesh cricket.

Following the third round of fixtures, the tournament took a break, ahead of the 2017–18 Dhaka Premier Division Cricket League. The tournament resumed on 10 April 2018.

South Zone won the tournament, after beating the defending champions North Zone by an innings and 63 runs in the final round of matches.

Points table

Fixtures

Round 1

Round 2

Round 3

Round 4

Round 5

Round 6

References

External links
 Series home at ESPN Cricinfo

2017-18
Bangladesh Cricket League
2018 in Bangladeshi cricket
Bangladeshi cricket seasons from 2000–01